Atractus ecuadorensis, the Ecuadorean ground snake, is a species of snake in the family Colubridae. The species can be found in Ecuador.

References 

Atractus
Reptiles of Ecuador
Endemic fauna of Ecuador
Reptiles described in 1955
Taxa named by Jay M. Savage